Romeo y Julieta can refer to:

 The Spanish name for the Shakespeare play Romeo and Juliet
 Romeo y Julieta (TV series), an Argenti based on the play
 Romeo y Julieta (cigar), two brands of Cuban and Dominican cigars
 Romeo y Julieta (cigarette), a brand of Cuban cigarettes
 Romeo and Juliet (1943 film), a Mexican film